Bloodstone & Diamonds is the eighth studio album by American heavy metal band Machine Head, released via Nuclear Blast on November 7, 2014. It is the first album to feature Jared MacEachern who replaced founding bassist Adam Duce in 2013. Although the album does not have a title track, the album gets its name from a lyric from the opening track and second single, "Now We Die".

Background
The album was once again mixed by Colin Richardson with additional tracking, editing, and mixing by Andy Sneap and Steve Lagudi. All album art was done by Travis Shinn. It is the band's first album not to be released on Roadrunner Records.

Lyrics and themes 
Like with previous Machine Head releases, the album's lyrics detail political and social themes, particularly civil unrest, dissatisfaction and injustice, often with violent conclusions. The song "Night of Long Knives" is not about the Röhm-Putsch, but instead the Manson Family murders in Hollywood in 1969.

"Imaginal Cells" is an instrumental featuring samples from the audiobook Spontaneous Evolution by Dr. Bruce Lipton and Steve Bhaerman.

Reception 
The album was met with universal acclaim by music critics, with Dom Lawson of The Guardian writing "Striking an exquisite balance between brute force, insistent melody and bold experimentation, this is the finest mainstream metal album of 2014 by a huge margin." In the first week of release, the album debuted at No. 21 on the Billboard 200 chart, becoming the band's highest charting album ever.

Track listing

Personnel

Machine Head

 Robb Flynn – lead vocals, rhythm guitar, keyboards (tracks 1, 3, 5, 8), string arrangement (1, 5, 8), percussion (5)
 Phil Demmel – lead guitar
 Jared MacEachern – bass, backing vocals 
 Dave McClain – drums, guitars (track 9)

Additional personnel
 Rhys Fulber – keyboards & string arrangement (tracks 1, 5), percussion (5)
 Jordan Fish (of Bring Me the Horizon) – keyboards (tracks 3, 8, 9), string arrangement (8)
 Kathryn Marshall, Eugenia Wie, Chad Kaltinger and Vanessa Ruotolo – strings (track 1)
 Phillip Brezina, Charles Akert and Ivo Bukolic – strings (track 8)

Production
 Andy Sneap – tracking, editing
 Colin Richardson – mixing
 Juan Urteaga – production, engineering
 Lee Bothwick – engineering
 Steve Lagudi – engineering
 Ted Jensen – mastering
 Strephon Taylor – design, layout

Charts

References

External links 
 
 Bloodstone & Diamonds at Nuclear Blast

2014 albums
Machine Head (band) albums
Nuclear Blast albums